This event was held on Saturday 30 January 2010 in Tábor, Czech Republic as a part of the 2010 UCI Cyclo-cross World Championships. The length of the course was 21.86 km (0.16 km + 7 laps of 3.10 km each).

At first, the brothers Pawel and Kacper Szczepaniak (from Poland) occupied the gold and silver medals, respectively. However, in March 2010 they were found guilty of doping and thus disqualified.

Ranking

Notes

External links
 Union Cycliste Internationale
 

Men's under-23 race
UCI Cyclo-cross World Championships – Men's under-23 race
2010 in cyclo-cross